The canton of Gien is an administrative division of the Loiret department, central France. Its borders were modified at the French canton reorganisation which came into effect in March 2015. Its seat is in Gien.

It consists of the following communes:
 
Adon
Autry-le-Châtel
Batilly-en-Puisaye
Beaulieu-sur-Loire
Boismorand
Bonny-sur-Loire
Breteau
Briare
La Bussière
Cernoy-en-Berry
Champoulet
Châtillon-sur-Loire
Les Choux
Dammarie-en-Puisaye
Escrignelles
Faverelles
Feins-en-Gâtinais
Gien
Langesse
Le Moulinet-sur-Solin
Nevoy
Ousson-sur-Loire
Ouzouer-sur-Trézée
Pierrefitte-ès-Bois
Saint-Firmin-sur-Loire
Thou

References

Cantons of Loiret